Laurie S. Sutton (born March 19, 1953) is an American writer of comic books and children's books. She worked for DC Comics and Marvel Comics in the 1980s and has written several books for Capstone Publishers in the 2010s.

Career
Laurie S. Sutton was born in Woodbury, New Jersey. Her father was a project manager for Mobil and the family frequently moved across the country. She began reading comic books at the age of 8 after receiving a large number of them as a Christmas gift. After graduating from Sarah Lawrence College in 1975, Sutton worked for Abaris Books and the Comics Code Authority. Sutton has stated that "when I was a reviewer at the Comics Code from 1978 to 1979, I never considered my job to be one of censorship...As a matter of fact, being a comic book fan, I was very open-minded and lenient with artists, writers and editors who brushed up against the letter of the regulations." She began writing for DC Comics in 1980 and worked on the "Adam Strange" backup feature in Green Lantern as well as stories for Secrets of Haunted House, Star Trek, and  The Unexpected. Frank Miller credits Sutton with introducing him to Japanese comics which influenced his work on Ronin. She worked as an editor for DC (1981–1982) and oversaw "The Great Darkness Saga" storyline in the Legion of Super-Heroes. After leaving DC, Sutton worked for Marvel Comics' Epic Comics line (1983–1985) and for Donning Publishing from 1985 to 1987. She returned to comics in the mid-1990s and wrote Star Trek: Voyager stories for Marvel.

Sutton has written several children's books for Capstone Publishers featuring various DC Comics characters. She credits DC executive Paul Levitz for helping her get this job. She won the Publishing Innovation Award in the category "Ebook – Flowable: Children" for her book Scooby-Doo!: The Terror of the Bigfoot Beast in 2015.

Bibliography

Comic books

DC Comics
 Green Lantern #133–147 (Adam Strange backup stories) (1980–1981)  
 Secrets of Haunted House #24 (1980)
 Star Trek #20 (1985)
 The Unexpected #210 (1981)

Malibu Comics
 Star Trek: Deep Space Nine #17–18, Annual #1 (1994–1995)

Marvel Comics
 Epic Illustrated #22, 24, 28 (1984–1985) 
 Star Trek: Voyager #1–3, 10–15 (1996–1998)  
 Star Trek: Voyager Splashdown #1–4 (1998)  
 Witch Hunter #1 (1996)

Warren Publications
 Creepy #106 (1979) 
 Vampirella #85 (1980)

Children's books

Capstone Publishers

 Batman & Robin Adventures: Clayface's Slime Spree 88 pages, March 2016, 
 Batman Classic: Going Ape 32 pages, April 2012, 
 Batman: The Joker's Dozen 112 pages, February 2015, 
 The Dark Knight: Batman vs. the Penguin 88 pages, August 2013, 
 Far Out Fairy Tales: Goldilocks and the Three Vampires 40 pages, August 2016, 
 Scooby-Doo: The Curse of Atlantis 112 pages, August 2015, 
 Scooby-Doo: The Fright at Zombie Farm 112 pages, February 2015,  
 Scooby-Doo: The Ghost of the Bermuda Triangle 112 pages, August 2014,  
 Scooby-Doo: The House on Spooky Street 112 pages, August 2015, 
 Scooby-Doo: The Mystery of the Aztec Tomb 112 pages, August 2014, 
 Scooby-Doo: The Secret of the Flying Saucer 112 pages, August 2015, 
 Scooby-Doo: The Secret of the Sea Creature 112 pages, February 2014, 
 Scooby-Doo: The Terror of the Bigfoot Beast 112 pages, February 2014, 
 Superman: The Planet Collector 88 pages, August 2014,  
 Superman: The Real Man of Steel 88 pages, August 2014, 
 Wonder Woman: Sword of the Dragon 56 pages, February 2014,

References

External links
 
 Laurie S. Sutton at Mike's Amazing World of Comics
 Michael, Age 7, Interviews One of His Favorite KidLit Authors: Laurie Sutton at YouTube

1953 births
American children's writers
American comics writers
Comic book editors
Female comics writers
Living people
Marvel Comics writers
People from Woodbury, New Jersey
Sarah Lawrence College alumni
Writers from New Jersey